was a military leader and kugyō of the late Heian period of Japan.  He established the first samurai-dominated administrative government in the history of Japan.

Early life
Kiyomori was born in Heian-kyō, Japan, in 1118 as the first son of Taira no Tadamori, who was the head of the Taira clan. It has been speculated that Kiyomori was actually an illegitimate son of Emperor Shirakawa. His mother, Gion no Nyogo, was a palace servant according to The Tale of the Heike.

Family 
 Father: Taira no Tadamori
 Mother: Gion no Nyogo (d. 1147)
Concubines and regents:
Wife: N/A
 Taira no Shigemori
 Taira no Munemori
 Taira no Tomomori
 Taira no Tokuko
 Taira no Shigehira

Career
After the death of his father in 1153, Kiyomori assumed control of the Taira clan and ambitiously entered the political realm in which he had previously only held a minor post. Before that though, in 1156, he and Minamoto no Yoshitomo, head of the Minamoto clan, suppressed the rebels in the Hōgen Rebellion. This established the Taira and Minamoto as the top samurai clans in Kyoto.  However, this caused the allies to become bitter rivals which culminated four years later during the Heiji Rebellion in 1160. Kiyomori, emerging victorious with Yoshitomo (whose two eldest sons were killed), was now the head of the single most powerful warrior clan in Kyoto.  However, his clan's power and influence in the provinces at this time is a matter of debate. Kiyomori showed mercy and exiled a few of Yoshitomo's surviving sons, including Yoritomo, Noriyori, and Yoshitsune – a benevolence that would turn out to be the Taira clan's downfall later on.

Due to his status as the head of the sole remaining warrior clan, Kiyomori was in a unique position to manipulate the court rivalry between the retired emperor, Go-Shirakawa, and his son, Emperor Nijō. Because of this manipulation, Kiyomori was able to climb the ranks of government, though the majority of his promotions as well as the success of his family in gaining ranks and titles at court was due to Shirakawa's patronage.  This culminated in 1167, when Kiyomori became the first courtier of a warrior family to be appointed daijō-daijin, chief minister of the government, and the de facto administrator of the imperial government.  As was the norm, he soon relinquished the position and leadership of the Taira clan, with the goal of maintaining the social and political prestige of having attained the highest office in the land, but being free of the attendant duties.  This had been a common practice for many years in the highest levels of Japanese government and in doing so Kiyomori was asserting what he felt was his strong position in the Kyoto government.  However, many of the courtiers from traditional (non-warrior) noble families were less than pleased with both Kiyomori's attainment of power, and how he comported himself with regard to other high ranking courtiers.

In 1171, Kiyomori arranged a marriage between his daughter Tokuko and Emperor Takakura.  Their first son, the future Emperor Antoku, was born in 1178. The next year, in 1179, Kiyomori staged a coup d'état that forced the resignation of his rivals from all government posts and subsequently banishing them. He then filled the open government positions with his allies and relatives, and imprisoned the cloistered Emperor Go-Shirakawa. Finally, in 1180 Kiyomori forced Emperor Takakura to abdicate and give Prince Tokihito the throne, who then became Emperor Antoku.

With the exertion of Taira power and wealth and Kiyomori's new monopoly on authority, many of his allies, most of the provincial samurai, and even members of his own clan turned against him. Prince Mochihito, brother of Emperor Takakura, called on Kiyomori's old rivals of the Minamoto clan to rise against the Taira, beginning the Genpei War in the middle of 1180. Kiyomori died early the next year from sickness, leaving his son Munemori to preside over the downfall and destruction of the Taira at the hands of the Minamoto in 1185.

The Tale of the Heike states that as he lay dying, Kiyomori's fever was so high that anyone who attempted to even get near him would be burned by the heat.

Cultural references

Taira no Kiyomori is the main character in the Kamakura period epic, the Tale of Heike.

The Daiei Film production of Kenji Mizoguchi's 1955 film Shin Heike Monogatari (variously translated as Taira clan Saga, Tales of the Taira Clan, and The Sacrilegious Hero) credits its story as "from the novel by Yoshikawa Eiji", which in turn is a 1950 retelling of the 14th-century epic The Tale of the Heike. The opening introduction to the film, in its English subtitles, is

Unlike most other tellings, Mizoguchi's film includes only the story of Taira no Kiyomori's youth, depicting him as a heroic character, particularly in breaking the power of the tyrannical armed monks and their palanquin shrines, where he says at his father's grave "Father, with two arrows from my bow I destroyed a superstition that gripped men for centuries. The courtiers and priests have tried to have me for blasphemy. But others have supported me, more than I expected. Some of them are lords, too. Father, a greater battle lies ahead. But I remain undaunted. No matter how I am beaten, I shall rise again". The film then ends with Kiyomori approaching an alfresco Fujiwara dance, vowing to himself, "Dance, my Lords, dance. Your end is near. Tomorrow will be ours!"

Taira no Kiyomori was featured by 19th-century woodblock print artists as an exemplar of guilt and retribution, see the accompanying print by Yoshitoshi. The famous print generally known as The Vision of Kiyomori by Utagawa Hiroshige depicts the actor Nakamura Utayemon IV in the character of Kiyomori, confronted by the horrific vision of his snow-filled garden transformed into the heaped bones and skulls of his slaughtered enemies.

In video games, Kiyomori appears in Warriors Orochi 2, 3 and 4 fighting for Orochi's army and using prayer beads as weapons. He also makes an appearance in Dynasty Warriors: Strikeforce as a boss in one of the game's Crossover Missions.  Additionally, he is the main antagonist in Harukanaru Toki no Naka de 3.

Kiyomori also features prominently as a sympathetic villain in Osamu Tezuka's Phoenix series in the first half of the ninth volume, Turbulent Times (retitled Civil War in English), another Genpei War epic. Like most villains in the series he desires the titular bird for its immortality granting blood, due to his desire to continue to lead and protect the Taira clan and lack of confidence in his successors, but winds up being tricked into buying an imported peacock instead.

A character named Lord Kiyomori appears in Book 6, "The Lords of the Rising Sun" in the Fabled Lands adventure gamebook series, where he is portrayed as the Imperial Sovereign Takakura's chancellor, and on the verge of war with the self-proclaimed shogun by the name of "Yoritomo".

The 2012 NHK Taiga drama was about him.

Honours
Junior First Rank (11 February 1167)

See also
 Taira no Shigemori
 Shishigatani incident
 Fukuhara-kyō
 Itsukushima Shrine
 Siege of Shirakawa-den

References

1118 births
1181 deaths
Taira clan
People of Heian-period Japan
Deified Japanese people
Heian period Buddhist clergy
Japanese Buddhist clergy
12th-century Buddhist monks